Simoncini is an Italian-language surname. Notable people with the surname include:

 Aldo Junior Simoncini (born 1986), Sammarinese footballer
 Anita Simoncini (born 1999), Sammarinese singer
 Davide Simoncini (born 1986), Sammarinese footballer
 Francesco Simoncini (died 1967), Italian type designer and founder of Simoncini SA
 Matt Simoncini, chief executive officer and president of Lear Corporation from 2011
 Salvatore Simoncini, 19th century Italian painter
 Tullio Simoncini (born 1951), alternative cancer treatment advocate
 Valeria Simoncini (born 1966), Italian mathematician

See also

Italian-language surnames
Patronymic surnames
Surnames from given names